Anna Dziedzic is an Australian academic specialising in comparative constitutional law, with particular expertise on the constitutional implications of the use of foreign judges within courts in Pacific island states.

Academic career 
Following a BA/LLB from the Australian National University Dziedzic returned to research for a PhD at the University of Melbourne, graduating in 2018 with her thesis titled The use of foreign judges on courts of constitutional jurisdiction in Pacific island states. As of 2020, Dziedzic is Global Academic Fellow and associate director of the Centre for Comparative and Public Law at the University of Hong Kong.

Awards 
 2018 Richard Hart Prize for the best paper by an early career scholar, granted by the biannual 'Public Law Conference' hosted jointly by the University of Melbourne and University of Cambridge.

References

External links 
 
 

Year of birth missing (living people)
Living people
Australian academics
Australian National University alumni
University of Melbourne alumni
Academic staff of the University of Hong Kong